Calephelis nemesis (fatal metalmark or dusky metalmark) is a butterfly in the family Riodinidae. It is found in the southern part of the United States and Mexico. Its habitats include chaparral canyons near rivers in arid areas, roads, and washes.

The wingspan is 20–25 mm. The upperside of the wings is brown with somewhat darker median bands. The fringes are checkered. Adults feed on flower nectar.

The larvae feed on Encelia californica, Baccharis glutinosa, Clematis drummondii and Clematis henryi.

Subspecies
Calephelis nemesis nemesis (northern Mexico, Arizona)
Calephelis nemesis australis (W.H. Edwards, 1877) (Texas)
Calephelis nemesis californica McAlpine, 1971 (California)
Calephelis nemesis dammersi McAlpine, 1971 (California)

References

Butterflies described in 1871
Riodinidae
Taxa named by William Henry Edwards
Butterflies of North America